Bullock Park is a townland in County Tyrone, Northern Ireland. It is situated in the historic barony of Omagh West and the civil parish of Longfield West and covers an area of 398 acres.

The population of the townland increased slightly overall during the 19th century:

The townland contains one Scheduled Historic Monument: a Portal tomb (grid ref:  H2778 7892).

See also
List of townlands of County Tyrone
List of archaeological sites in County Tyrone

References

Townlands of County Tyrone
Archaeological sites in County Tyrone
Civil parish of Longfield West